Japonicrambus mitsundoi is a moth in the family Crambidae. It was described by Akio Sasaki and Utsugi Jinbo in 2002. It is found in Honshu, Japan.

References

Crambinae
Moths described in 2002